Cochlodina fimbriata is a species of gastropods belonging to the family Clausiliidae.

The species is found in Europe.

References

Clausiliidae
Gastropods of Europe
Gastropods described in 1835